"All I See Is Your Face" is a 1978 song written and performed by Dan Hill. It was released as a 7-inch single from Dan Hill's Frozen in the Night album, with "Longer Fuse" on the B-side. The song was produced by Fred Mollin and Matthew McCauley. The song reached No. 8 on the US Adult Contemporary chart and No. 41 on the Billboard Hot 100. The song has been included on several compilation albums, including The Best of Dan Hill (1980), The Dan Hill Collection (1983), Let Me Show You: Greatest Hits & More (1994), and Love of My Life: The Best of Dan Hill (1999).

Chart positions

References

1978 singles
20th Century Fox Records singles
Pop ballads
Dan Hill songs
1978 songs
Songs written by Dan Hill